Vrhole pri Slovenskih Konjicah is a settlement in the Municipality of Slovenska Bistrica in northeastern Slovenia. It lies on the old main road roughly halfway between Slovenska Bistrica and Slovenjske Konjice. The area is part of the traditional region of Styria. It is now included with the rest of the municipality in the Drava Statistical Region.

Name
The name of the settlement was changed from Vrhole to Vrhole pri Slovenskih Konjicah in 1953.

References

External links
Vrhole pri Slovenskih Konjicah at Geopedia

Populated places in the Municipality of Slovenska Bistrica